Dorcadion lorquinii is a species of beetle in the family Cerambycidae. It was described by Fairmaire in 1855. It is known from Spain.

Subspecies
 Dorcadion lorquinii cobosi Vives, 1979
 Dorcadion lorquinii lorquinii Fairmaire, 1855

See also 
Dorcadion

References

lorquinii
Beetles described in 1855